Hunter River is a municipality that holds community status in Prince Edward Island, Canada. It is located in Queens County southwest of North Rustico. It is situated on the Hunter River.

It has been suggested that Hunter River is represented in the works of Lucy Maud Montgomery as Bright River in the fictional region of Avonlea.

James Charles McGuigan, who became Archbishop of Toronto and a Cardinal, was born in Hunter River.

Demographics 

References

External links 
 Official Community of Hunter River website

Communities in Queens County, Prince Edward Island
Rural municipalities in Prince Edward Island